An election to Carmarthen District Council was held on 7 May 1987.  It was preceded by the 1983 election and followed by the 1991 election. On the same day there were elections to the other local authorities and community councils in Wales.

Boundary changes
A limited number of boundary changes had taken place since the previous election. Some wards were also renamed.

Results

Abergwili (one seat)
The ward used to be known as Abergwili and Llanllawddog. The winning candidate had represented the SDP-Liberal Alliance at the 1983 election.

Carmarthen Town North (four seats)
The ward used to be known as Carmarthen Town Ward One. Two of the sitting Labour candidates were de-selected by the party, but stood successfully as independents.

Carmarthen Town South (two seats)
The ward used to be known as Carmarthen Town Ward Two.

Carmarthen Town West (three seats)
The ward used to be known as Carmarthen Town Ward Three. David Crane had been elected at a by-election following the resignation of previous Liberal councillor David Nam.

Cenarth (one seat)
The ward used to be known as Newcastle Emlyn.

Clynderwen (one seat)
The ward used to be known as Cilymaenllwyd.

Cynwyl Elfed (one seat)
The ward used to be known as Cynwyl Elfed and Llanpumsaint.

Gorslas (two seats)
The previous three-member Llanarthney and Llanddarog ward was split into a two-member ward (Gorslas) and a single-member ward (Llanddarog).

Laugharne Township (one seat)
The previous two-member Laugharne Township ward was split into a two single-member wards (Laugharne Township and Llanddowror). The sitting member had been elected at a by-election following the death of Elwyn John.

Llanboidy (one seat)
The ward used to be known as Henllanfallteg.

Llanddarog (one seat)
The previous three-member Llanarthney and Llanddarog ward was split into a two-member ward (Gorslas) and a single-member ward (Llanddarog).

Llanddowror (one seat)
The previous two-member Laugharne Township ward was split into a two single-member wards (Laugharne Township and Llanddowror).

Llandyfaelog (one seats)
The previous two-member Llandyfaelog ward was split into a two single-member wards (Llandyfaelog and St Ishmaels).

Llanfihangel-ar-Arth (one seat)
The seat had been won by Plaid Cymru at a by-election.

Llangeler (two seats)

Llangynnwr (two seats)
Boundary change: the previous ward was divided to create an additional Newchurch ward.

Llangyndeyrn (two seats)

Llanllwni (one seat)
The ward used to be known as Llanfihangel Rhos-y-Corn.

Llansteffan (one seat)
The ward used to be known as Llangain.

Llanybydder (two seats)
The previous two-member Llanllwni ward was split into a two single-member wards (Llanybydder and Pencarreg).

Newchurch (one seat)
This additional ward was created following the division of the Llangynnwr ward, which retained two seats.

Pencarreg (one seats)
The previous two-member Llanllwni ward was split into a two single-member wards (Llanybydder and Pencarreg).

St Clears (two seats)

St Ishmael (one seat)
The previous two-member Llandyfaelog ward was split into a two single-member wards (Llandyfaelog and St Ishmaels).

Trelech (one seat)
The ward used to be known as Abernant.

Whitland (one seat)

References

Carmarthen District Council elections
Carmarthen District Council election
20th century in Carmarthenshire